Guido Alves Pereira Neto (born 9 March 1976 in Ribeirão Preto) is a Brazilian retired professional association football player.

Playing career 
Guido was signed by MetroStars in 1997. He had trouble acclimating to the American lifestyle while living in Newark's Ironbound district.

Statistics

References

External links 
 
 Guido at MetroFanatic.com
 

1976 births
Living people
Brazilian footballers
Brazilian expatriate footballers
Association football midfielders
New York Red Bulls players
FC St. Gallen players
Shanghai Shenhua F.C. players
Major League Soccer players
Expatriate soccer players in the United States
Footballers from São Paulo (state)